Jered Taylor (born February 1, 1984) is an American politician who has served in the Missouri House of Representatives from the 139th district since 2015.

References

1984 births
Living people
Republican Party members of the Missouri House of Representatives
People from Nixa, Missouri
21st-century American politicians